The 1972 Benson and Hedges British Open Championship was held at the Abbeydale Park Squash Club in Sheffield from 28 January - 5 February 1972. Jonah Barrington won his fifth title defeating Geoff Hunt in the final. The event was sponsored for the first time by Benson and Hedges.

Seeds

Draw and results

First round

Second round

Main draw

Eighth seed Mohamed Yasin (Pakistan) withdrew before the tournament started.

References

Men's British Open Squash Championships
Squash in England
1972 in squash
1972 in British sport
1970s in Sheffield
Sports competitions in Sheffield
Men's British Open Squash Championship
Men's British Open Squash Championship